The Yalong River (p Yǎlóngjiāng, w Ya-lung Chiang, IPA ), or Nyag Chu (Tibetan: , z Nyag Qu), is a major tributary river of the Yangtze River in Southwest China.

Course
The Yalong has its source in the Bayan Har Mountains on the Tibet–Qinghai Plateau in Chindu County, Yushu, Qinghai, where it is known as the Za Qu.  Flowing southeasterly, the Yalong gradually turns south at Garzê and travels between the Shaluli Mountains to the west and the Daxue Mountains to the east.  The Yalong River channel runs through a deep gorge for much of its length south of Garzê.  The southern Sichuan-Tibet Highway crosses the Yalong at Yajiang in the middle of the river's course.  In Liangshan Prefecture, the river wraps  around the Jinping Mountains creating the Jinping Bend.  Here, water from the Yalong River has been diverted under the mountains as part of the Jinping-II Dam hydroelectric project.  The Yalong meets the main stem of the Yangtze (Jinsha) River in Panzhihua, Sichuan.

History
The upper reaches of the Yalong have traditionally been inhabited by the Tibetan nomads of the historic region of Kham.  The lower course of the Yalong is deeply incised and is not conducive to human habitation.  The lower course of the Yalong was historically the western limit of Chinese influence in region.

Dams
Since the 1980s, the Yalong has been heavily developed for hydroelectric power.  A total of 23 dams are completed, under construction, or planned for the river. Those dams are listed below from downstream to upstream.
Tongzilin Dam – Under construction, 600 MW
Ertan Dam – Completed, 3,300 MW
Guandi Dam – Completed, 2,400 MW
Jinping 2 Dam – Completed, 4,800 MW
Jinping 1 Dam – Completed, 3,600 MW
Kala Dam – Programmed, 1,060 MW
Yangfanggou Dam – Programmed, 2,200 MW
Mengdigou Dam – Programmed, 1,700 MW
Lenggu Dam – Planned, 2,300 MW
Yagen Dam – Programmed, 1,500 MW
Lianghekou Dam – Completed, 3,000 MW
Gongbagou Dam – Planned, 500 MW
Gongke Dam – Planned, 400 MW
Xinlong Dam – Planned, 500 MW
Yingda Dam – Planned, 500 MW
Tongha Dam – Planned, 200 MW
Geni Dam – Planned, 200 MW
Ada Dam – Planned, 250 MW
Reba Dam – Planned, 250 MW
Renqingling Dam – Planned, 300 MW
Wenbosi Dam – Planned, 150 MW
Danikanduo Dam – Planned, 7.2 MW
Yangri Dam – Planned, 1 MW

References

External links
 

Rivers of Sichuan
Tributaries of the Yangtze River